Kentron may refer to:
Kentron, the former name of South African arms company Denel Dynamics
Kentron Seeker, an unmanned aerial vehicle (UAV) manufactured by Denel Dynamics
Kentron Bateleur, an unmanned aerial vehicle (UAV) manufactured by Denel Dynamics
Kentron District, a district of Yerevan, Armenia
Kentron TV, an Armenian private television broadcasting company

See also
Kentro (disambiguation), several villages in Greece